Tomruksuyu is a town in Samandağ district of Hatay Province, Turkey. At  it is to the north of the highway connecting Samandağ to Antakya (the capital of the province). The population of Tomruksuyu was 3,338  as of 2012. The settlement was founded in 1807 during the Ottoman Empire era, after an earthquake. Between 1918 and 1938, like most other settlements in Hatay Province it was under French rule. The original name was Karamanlı. But after 1960, it was renamed Tomruksuyu. In 1999 it was declared a seat of township. Vegetables and olive are the two important crop of Tomruksuyu.

References

External links 
 
 Images

Populated places in Hatay Province
Towns in Turkey
Samandağ District